The Saint Charles Borromeo Major Seminary of Nyakibanda is a Roman Catholic seminary near to Butare, in the Gishamvu sector of the Huye District in Southern Province of Rwanda, below the mountain chain called "Ibisi bya Nyakibanda".

Overview 
The Nyakibanda Major Seminary was created in 1936. The seminary is under the jurisdiction of the Conference of Bishops of Rwanda, who in turn are under the Holy See in Rome, which is represented by the Congregation for the Evangelization of Peoples.

As of 2007 there were 186 seminarians taking the four-year course. As of 2011 the rector was father Antoine Kambanda. Kambanda was appointed in February 2006. He replaced Monseigneur Smaragde Mbonyintege, who had been named a bishop.

References

Charles Borromeo
Catholic Church in Rwanda
Rwanda
Rwanda
Educational institutions established in 1936
Buildings and structures in Butare
Education in Rwanda